Mattia Nanni Monticone (born 11 May 1994) is an Italian professional footballer who plays as a defender for  club Città di Varese.

Career
Born in Genoa, Italy, Monticone started his career at Genoese club Sampdoria. In January 2013 he left for Pavia on loan. On 2 July 2013, he was sent to Italian third division club Lumezzane in co-ownership deal.

On 9 June 2021, Monticone joined Città di Varese.

References

External links
 AIC profile (data by football.it) 
 
 

1994 births
Living people
Footballers from Genoa
Italian footballers
Association football defenders
U.C. Sampdoria players
F.C. Pavia players
F.C. Lumezzane V.G.Z. A.S.D. players
Savona F.B.C. players
U.S. Folgore Caratese A.S.D. players
A.S.D. Città di Varese players
Serie C players
Serie D players
Italy youth international footballers